Carlos Bernard Papierski (born October 12, 1962) is an American actor and director, best known for his role as Tony Almeida in 24, which he played from 2001 to 2006, and then reprised again in 2009, 2014 in 24: Solitary and 2017 in 24: Legacy. He received a fine arts degree from American Conservatory Theater in San Francisco after receiving an undergraduate degree from Illinois State University.

Early life and education
Bernard was born on October 12, 1962, in Evanston, Illinois and grew up in Chicago, Illinois, the youngest of three brothers. Of Polish and Spanish ancestry, his mother is originally from Madrid, Spain. Bernard graduated from New Trier High School in 1980, and showed signs of interest in acting while in his high school years. He then went to Illinois State University, graduating with a bachelor's degree in 1991 and shortly after received his Master of Fine Arts degree in San Francisco in the American Conservatory Theater. Bernard started out on stage but quickly progressed to television.

Career
Bernard performed in A.C.T. stage productions:
 Good with William Hurt
 As You Like It
 Hamlet
 The Diary of Anne Frank
 The Cherry Orchard

At the Mark Taper Forum in Los Angeles, he performed in Scenes From an Execution, with Frank Langella.

Bernard has made guest appearances on Walker, Texas Ranger, Burn Notice, F/X: The Series, Babylon 5, and Silk Stalkings and appeared as a regular on the daytime soap opera, The Young and the Restless. He has appeared in the feature films Alien Raiders, Vegas, City of Dreams, The Killing Jar, and the short film The Colonel's Last Flight.

Personal life
Bernard speaks fluent Spanish, Russian, and German.

Bernard has been married to actress Tessie Santiago since 2013. They have a son born in August 2018. He also has one child, who was born in August 2003, with ex-wife Sharisse Baker. He is friends with Kiefer Sutherland, Reiko Aylesworth and Mary Lynn Rajskub, with whom he starred in 24.

Filmography

Acting

Other work

References

External links

 
 
 Carlos Bernard Official Website
 World Poker Tour Profile

1962 births
Living people
American male film actors
American male television actors
American male soap opera actors
Male actors from Chicago
New Trier High School alumni
Male actors from Evanston, Illinois
American people of Spanish descent
American people of Polish descent
Illinois State University alumni
20th-century American male actors
21st-century American male actors
American Conservatory Theater alumni